This is a list of seasons of Stockholm, Sweden-based ice hockey club AIK IF.

References

AIK IF
AIK